Nobuaki (written: 信著, 信朗, 信明, 信昭, 信秋, 伸顕, 伸明, 伸彰, 修光 or 陳爾) is a masculine Japanese given name. Notable people with the name include:

, Japanese Go player
, Japanese baseball player
, American Imperial Japanese Army personnel
, Japanese karateka
, Japanese drummer and actor
Nobuaki Katayama, Japanese automotive engineer
, Japanese billiards player
, Japanese trade unionist
, Japanese Go player
, Japanese diplomat
, Japanese manga artist
, Japanese anime director
, Japanese politician
, Japanese anime director
, Japanese daimyō
Yamadera Nobuaki, Japanese samurai
, Japanese footballer and manager

Japanese masculine given names